Miguel Baeza Pérez (born 27 March 2000) is a Spanish professional footballer for Primeira Liga club Rio Ave F.C., on loan from RC Celta de Vigo. Mainly an attacking midfielder, he can also play as a left winger.

Club career

Real Madrid
Born in Córdoba, Andalusia, Baeza joined Real Madrid's La Fábrica in 2012, from hometown side Séneca CF. On 6 January 2019, while still a junior, he made his senior debut with the reserves by starting in a 3–0 Segunda División B away loss against Pontevedra CF. 

Definitely promoted to the B-side for the 2019–20 season, Baeza scored his first senior goal on 31 August 2019, netting his team's third in a 3–1 home win against Marino de Luanco. The following 26 January, he scored a hat-trick in a 3–1 home success over SCR Peña Deportiva.

Celta
On 15 August 2020, Baeza moved straight to La Liga after agreeing to a five-year contract with RC Celta de Vigo, for a rumoured fee of €2.5 million for 50% of his federative rights. He made his debut for the club on 12 September, coming on as a second-half substitute for Brais Méndez in a 0–0 away draw against SD Eibar. On 29 November, he scored his first professional goal in a 3–1 home win over Granada CF.

Baeza was loaned to Segunda División side SD Ponferradina on 6 January 2022 for the remainder of the season. On 31 August the same year, hemoved abroad for the first time in his career, joining Primeira Liga side Rio Ave F.C. on a one-year loan deal.

Career statistics

References

External links

2000 births
Living people
Spanish footballers
Footballers from Córdoba, Spain
Association football midfielders
La Liga players
Segunda División players
Segunda División B players
Primeira Liga players
Real Madrid Castilla footballers
RC Celta de Vigo players
SD Ponferradina players
Rio Ave F.C. players
Spain youth international footballers
Spanish expatriate footballers
Spanish expatriate sportspeople in Portugal
Expatriate footballers in Portugal